Mukundrao Pedgaonkar(1897–1990), was an Indian Lawyer and social activist who was active during the Telangana Rebellion, during the reign of the last Nizam. He was the main leader of the Hyderabad State Congress.

1897 births
1990 deaths
Hyderabad State politicians
Indian independence activists
20th-century Indian lawyers
Indian National Congress politicians from Andhra Pradesh
Telangana Rebellion
People from Parbhani district